Giorgio Moser (9 October 1923 – 25 September 2004) was an Italian film director and screenwriter. He directed seven films between 1954 and 1996.

Selected filmography
 Romulus and the Sabines (1945)
 Lost Continent (1955)
Un reietto delle isole (based on by Joseph Conrad's novel An Outcast of the Islands) (with Maria Carta) (1980)

References

External links

1923 births
2004 deaths
Italian film directors
20th-century Italian screenwriters
Italian male screenwriters
People from Trento
20th-century Italian male writers